This is a list of members of the European Parliament for Latvia for the 2019–2024 Parliament.

See 2019 European Parliament election in Latvia for further information on these elections in Latvia.

List

References 

2019
List
Latvia